The Grand Forks International (GFI) is an annual international invitational baseball tournament hosted at James Donaldson Park in Grand Forks, British Columbia. The GFI is the largest invitational baseball tournament in Canada and is a large part of the culture in Grand Forks. The tournament is also notable for being run entirely by volunteers.

History 

The Grand Forks International was founded by Larry Seminoff, and the tournament led to the existence of the World Baseball Challenge, initially starting in 2002, at James Donaldson Park.  The 2015 prize purse is $54,000.

Past winners 

Prior winners of the tournament are:

Alumni 

Notable Grand Forks International Alumni

Rules 

Rule 1:
The official rules of baseball, as published by Baseball Canada, shall govern the playing of baseball games during the tournament. Specifications as to facility, equipment, play-off format, etc. have been modified to meet the needs of the tournament. Teams may elect to use the designated hitter rule.

Rule 2:
All games will be nine (9) innings. Extra innings to be played to determine winners.

Rule 3:
Toss of a coin at home plate will determine home team for all preliminary round games. Teams with better records, as determined by the tournament rules, will be the Home Teams for all Money Round games.

Rule 4:
Teams must be prepared to play ball when scheduled. Infield drills will be permitted only if time allows.

Rule 5:
The 20 second rule between pitches will be invoked. If the pitcher has not delivered the ball to the batter within 20 seconds after receiving the ball an automatic ball will be issued to the batter. If the batter is not set in the batter’s box within the 20 seconds and the pitcher is ready to throw an automatic strike will be issued.

Rule 6:
After the third out of each at bat the teams have 90 seconds to resume play.

Rule 7:
An Eight Run rule will apply to all tournament games except the semi-finals and final. If one team is ahead by eight or more runs after the trailing team has completed seven innings the game is over.

Rule 8:
Should circumstances arise where a game or games are postponed or cancelled, the Tournament Rules Committee (TRC) has the authority to act upon any alteration to the tournament format or schedule.

Rule 9:
There are no restrictions relative to roster size. However, teams will not be permitted to add to their roster any player who was on the roster of a team eliminated earlier from further competition.

Rule 10:
Should a protest arise, that protest must officially be brought to the attention of the home plate umpire, who in turn will forward such protest to the Tournament Protest Committee Chairman or designate. This Committee will then rule on the identified protest and their decision will be final.

Rule 11:
In the event a contest is forfeited, the team receiving the forfeiture shall claim a 7-0 win. The forfeiting team, meanwhile, shall surrender all earnings, if any, to the tournament.

Rule 12:
The top two teams in each division will qualify for the tournament’s Money Round.

Rule 13:
Two wild card teams with the best record after the top two division teams are determined will complete the eight team Money Round.

Rule 14:
Tie Breaker Rule: the following Rule will determine division winners, division runner-up teams, wild card teams, and Money Round seeding.

Tie Breaker Rule: 
 Runs allowed / innings played defensively.
 Earned Run average.
 Runs for / innings played offensively

Rule 15:
A playoff game of 5 innings will be held to determine the second wild card team in the event of all 3 divisions having 3 teams with identical 2 - 1 round robin records.

Rule 16:
This is a wood bat tournament. Composite bats are allowed.

Rule 17:
Any player who is ejected from the game is subject to further discipline at the discretion of the Tournament Committee.

See also
Baseball awards#World

References

External links 
 Grand Forks International Tournament

Baseball in British Columbia
International baseball competitions hosted by Canada
Annual sporting events in Canada
1975 establishments in British Columbia
Recurring sporting events established in 1975